Enrique Delgado Coppiano (8 January 1937 – 19 March 2021) was an Ecuadorian politician who served as Minister of Agriculture from 1988 to 1989 and as a member of the National Congress of Ecuador from 1984 till 1988. 

He died from COVID-19 aged 84 on 19 March 2021, during the COVID-19 pandemic in Ecuador.

References

1937 births
2021 deaths
Members of the National Congress (Ecuador)
Deaths from the COVID-19 pandemic in Ecuador
Government ministers of Ecuador
People from Chone, Ecuador